The Red Road is a 1993 country music album by Native American singer Bill Miller. The album was his major-label debut, with Warner Western, and brought him to a broader popular country music public. The album has been classed among classic country "drivers'" albums.

Track listing

Personnel
 David Angell - violin
 Sam Bacco - percussion
 Richard Bennett - guitar
 Mike Brignardello - bass
 John Catchings - cello
 Joe Chemay - bass
 Bob Corbin - vocal harmonies
 David Davidson - violin
 Dan Dugmore - steel guitar
 Jim Grosjean - viola
 David Hoffner - keyboards
 Mary Ann Kennedy - voices
 Robert Mirabal - flute, voices
 Dave Pomeroy - bass
 Pamela Rose - voices
 Bill Miller - flute, guitar, harmonica, percussion

References

1993 albums